Kershaw Depot, also known as the Southern Railway Depot, is a historic train station located at Kershaw, Lancaster County, South Carolina. It was built in 1926, by the Southern Railway, and is the second or third depot built in Kershaw. The interior plan consists of a central ticketing area flanked by white and "colored" waiting areas. The Southern Railway sold the depot in 1945, and it has since been used as a florist and craft shop.

It was added to the National Register of Historic Places in 1990.

References

Railway stations on the National Register of Historic Places in South Carolina
Railway stations in the United States opened in 1926
Stations along Southern Railway lines in the United States
National Register of Historic Places in Lancaster County, South Carolina